Erin Krakow (born ) is an American actress and producer. She appeared in the Lifetime TV series Army Wives, and stars as Elizabeth Thornton in the Hallmark TV series When Calls the Heart.

Early life
Erin Alisa Krakow was born in Philadelphia, Pennsylvania. She later lived in Wellington, Florida, with her brother, Kyle Krakow, and her parents, Morgan Krakow and Dr. Elliott Krakow. She attended the Alexander W. Dreyfoos Jr School of the Arts in West Palm Beach, Florida. She studied drama at the Juilliard School in New York City, and began her acting career on stage, with roles in The Importance of Being Earnest, George the Fourth, and Steel Magnolias.

Career
From 2010 to 2012, Krakow had the recurring role of Specialist Tanya Gabriel in the Lifetime television drama series Army Wives, playing a medic in Afghanistan. She later guest-starred on the crime-comedy-drama series Castle.

In 2014, Krakow began starring as the lead character in the Hallmark Channel drama series When Calls the Heart, alongside Australian born actor Daniel Lissing. She plays teacher Miss Elizabeth Thatcher, a role originated by Poppy Drayton in the movie that spawned the series.

Krakow starred in the 2016 Hallmark Movies & Mysteries film Finding Father Christmas. Adapted from the novels of Robin Jones Gunn, she starred alongside Niall Matter, as Miranda Chester, a woman who visits a small Vermont town at Christmas time, looking for clues as to the identity of her father. At the time of broadcast, the film became the most watched premiere in the network's history. Hallmark announced a sequel to the film in May 2017. Filming for the sequel, entitled Engaging Father Christmas, took place in Vancouver in June 2017, with both Krakow and Matter reprising their roles. The film premiered on Hallmark Movies & Mysteries in November 2017. Krakow began filming a third installment in the series, entitled Marrying Father Christmas in March 2018. The film premiered in the USA on the Hallmark Movies & Mysteries channel on November 4, 2018, as part of their "Miracles of Christmas" seasonal programming.

Filmography

References

External links
 

Living people
21st-century American actresses
American television actresses
American stage actresses
Juilliard School alumni
Actresses from Philadelphia
Actresses from Florida
People from Wellington, Florida
1984 births